Harlan Howard Thompson (December 25, 1894 – October 9, 1987) was a writer of children's books. He was a member of P.E.N., and its international president from 1958–59, the Western Writers of America and other organizations. He wrote Prairie Colt under the penname Stephen Holt for which he received the Boys Clubs of America gold medal in 1947.

Thompson was born December 25, 1894, in Brewster, Kansas. He attended South Pasadena High School. He then attended the University of Southern California from 1917 to 1919, which houses his papers.

Among Thompson's books are Prairie Colt, which won the Boys Clubs of America gold medal in 1947 , Stormy, We were there with the California forty-niners, Wild Palomino and many other juvenile western books.  Spook the Mustang won the silver medal in fiction in the  1956 California Book Awards.

For many years, he owned the TX Ranch in Alberta, Canada.  He died on  October 9, 1987, in Pasadena, California.

References

1894 births
1987 deaths
People from Thomas County, Kansas
Writers from Kansas
Canadian ranchers
American children's writers
University of Southern California alumni